Kanza Javed (Urdu: کنزا جاويد) is a Pakistani author and poet, best known for her novel, Ashes, Wine and Dust and other short stories.

Early life and education 
Kanza Javed was born in Lahore, Pakistan.

She attended Kinnaird College for Women. She received an MFA in Fiction  from West Virginia University, where she won the late Rebecca Mason Perry Award.

Career 
Javed published her debut book, Ashes, Wine and Dust, in 2015. The novel was shortlisted for the Tibor Jones South Asia Prize. Javed started writing the book when she was 17, and was the first Pakistani and, as of 2020, the youngest writer to be nominated for the award. She had intended to release her book at the Indian Kumaon Literary festival, but was temporarily denied a visa, and released it via Skype in cooperation with the festival instead. Javed later released the book at the Jaipur Literary Festival.

Her short story, It Will Follow You Home, was published in American Literary Review (2020). Her short story, Carry It All was published in The Punch Magazine (2020). Her short story, Rani, won the 2020 International Literary Awards (The Reynolds Price Prize for Short Fiction) and was a finalist at Salamander Fiction Contest 2020. 

Her work was also selected as a finalist for The 51st New Millennium Award for Fiction (2021) and The Robert Watson Literary Prize 2021 (Greensboro Review Literary Awards).. 

Her second book, "What Remains After a Fire" was short-listed for the 2022 Santa Fe Writers Project Literary Awards.

References

External links

Living people
21st-century Pakistani women writers
21st-century Pakistani poets
Pakistani women poets
Pakistani women novelists
Pakistani novelists
Writers from Lahore
Kinnaird College for Women University alumni
West Virginia University alumni
21st-century novelists
Year of birth missing (living people)